A lost city is an urban settlement that fell into terminal decline and became extensively or completely uninhabited, with the consequence that the site's former significance was no longer known to the wider world. The locations of many lost cities have been forgotten, but some have been rediscovered and studied extensively by scientists. Recently abandoned cities or cities whose location was never in question might be referred to as ruins or ghost towns. The search for such lost cities by European explorers and adventurers in Africa, the Americas, and Southeast Asia from the 15th century onwards eventually led to the development of archaeology.

Lost cities generally fall into two broad categories: those where all knowledge of the city's existence was forgotten before it was rediscovered, and those whose memory was preserved in myth, legend, or historical records but whose location was lost or at least no longer widely recognized.

How cities are lost 
Cities may become lost for a variety of reasons including natural disasters, economic or social upheaval, or war.

The Incan capital city of Vilcabamba was destroyed and depopulated during the Spanish conquest of Peru in 1572. The Spanish did not rebuild the city, and the location went unrecorded and was forgotten until it was rediscovered through a detailed examination of period letters and documents.

Troy was a city located in northwest Anatolia in what is now Turkey. It is best known for being the focus of the Trojan War described in the Greek Epic Cycle and especially in the Iliad, one of the two epic poems attributed to Homer. Repeatedly destroyed and rebuilt, the city slowly declined and was abandoned in the Byzantine era. Buried by time, the city was consigned to the realm of legend until the location was first excavated in the 1860s.

Other settlements are lost with few or no clues to their abandonment. For example, Malden Island, in the central Pacific, was deserted when first visited by Europeans in 1825, but the remains of temples and other structures on the island indicate that a population of Polynesians had lived there for perhaps several generations in the past. Typically this lack of information is due to a lack of surviving written or oral histories and a lack of archaeological data as in the case of the remote and fairly unknown Malden Island.

Rediscovery 
With the development of archaeology and the application of modern techniques, many previously lost cities have been rediscovered.

Machu Picchu is a pre-Columbian Inca site situated on a mountain ridge above the Urubamba Valley in Peru. Often referred to as the "Lost City of the Incas", it is perhaps the most familiar icon of the Inca World. Machu Picchu was built around 1450, at the height of the Inca Empire. It was abandoned just over 100 years later, in 1572, as a belated result of the Spanish Conquest. It is possible that most of its inhabitants died from smallpox introduced by travelers before the Spanish conquistadors arrived in the area. In 1911, Melchor Arteaga led the explorer Hiram Bingham to Machu Picchu, which had been largely forgotten by everybody except the small number of people living in the immediate valley.

Helike was an ancient Greek city that sank at night in the winter of 373 BCE. The city was located in Achaea, Northern Peloponnesos, two kilometres (12 stadia) from the Corinthian Gulf. The city was thought to be legend until 2001, when it was rediscovered in the Helike Delta. In 1988, the Greek archaeologist Dora Katsonopoulou launched the Helike Project to locate the site of the lost city. In 1994, in collaboration with the University of Patras, a magnetometer survey was carried out in the midplain of the delta, which revealed the outlines of a buried building. In 1995, this target was excavated (now known as the Klonis site), and a large Roman building with standing walls was brought to light. The city was rediscovered in 2001, buried in an ancient lagoon.

Lost cities by continent

Africa

Rediscovered

Egypt 
 Akhetaten – Capital during the reign of 18th Dynasty pharaoh Akhenaten. Later abandoned and almost totally destroyed. Modern day Amarna.
 Avaris – capital city of the Hyksos in the Nile Delta.
 Canopus – Located on the now-dry Canopic branch of the Nile, east of Alexandria.
 Memphis – Administrative capital of ancient Egypt. Little remains. Now a UNESCO World Heritage site.
 Pi-Ramesses – Imperial city of Rameses the Great, now thought to exist beneath Qantir
 Tanis – Capital during the 21st and 22nd Dynasties, in the Delta region.

The Maghreb, including Libya  
 Carthage – Initially a Phoenician city in Tunisia, destroyed and then rebuilt by Rome. Later served as the capital of the Vandal Kingdom of North Africa, before being destroyed by the Arabs after its capture in 697 CE. Now a UNESCO World Heritage site.
 Dougga, Tunisia – Roman city located in present-day Tunisia. Now a UNESCO World Heritage site.
 Leptis Magna – Roman city located in present-day Libya. It was the birthplace of Emperor Septimius Severus, who lavished an extensive public works programme on the city, including diverting the course of a nearby river. The river later returned to its original course, burying much of the city in silt and sand. Now a UNESCO World Heritage site.
 Timgad, Algeria – Roman city founded by the emperor Trajan around 100 CE, covered by sand in the 7th century. Now a UNESCO World Heritage site.

Horn of Africa 
 Adulis, Eritrea – a port city of the Adulian kingdom built between 500 and 300 BC.
 Qohaito, Eritrea – 1000 BC city of the land of Punt, D'mt kingdom and kingdom of Axum.
 Metera, Eritrea – 800 BC lost town.
 Keskese, Eritrea – 700 BC lost city.
 Kubar, Eritrea – a lost major city of the Habesha land or Alhabesh
 Hubat, Ethiopia – capital of Harla Kingdom

Subsaharan Africa 
 Aoudaghost, Mauritania – Wealthy Berber city in medieval Ghana.
 Great Zimbabwe – Built between the 11th and the 14th century, this city is the namesake of modern-day Zimbabwe. Now a UNESCO World Heritage site.
 Niani – lost capital of the Mali Empire

Uncertain or disputed 
 Lost City of the Kalahari – possibly invented

Undiscovered 
 Itjtawy, Egypt – Capital during the 12th Dynasty. Exact location still unknown, but it is believed to lie near the modern town of el-Lisht.
 Thinis, Egypt – Undiscovered city and centre of the Thinite Confederacy, the leader of which, Menes, united Upper and Lower Egypt and was the first pharaoh.

Asia

Central Asia

Rediscovered 
 Ai-Khanoum
 Karakorum – Capital of the Mongol Empire under Genghis Khan.
 Khara-Khoto — Western Xia centre of trade located in Inner Mongolia, mentioned in The Travels of Marco Polo as Etzina.
 Loulan – Located in the Taklamakan Desert, on the ancient Silk Road route.
 Mangazeya, Siberia
 Niya – Located in the Taklamakan Desert, on the ancient Silk Road route.
 Old Urgench – capital of Khwarezm. Now a UNESCO World Heritage site.
 Otrar – City located along the Silk Road, important in the history of Central Asia.
 Poykent
 Subashi – Located in the Taklamakan Desert, on the ancient Silk Road route.

Undiscovered 
  Abaskun – Medieval Caspian Sea trading port
  Alexandria in Margiana

East Asia

Rediscovered 
 Xanadu – China Now a UNESCO World Heritage site.

Uncertain or Disputed 
 Yamatai – Japan

South Asia

India

Rediscovered 
 Dholavira – Located in Gujarat, India. City of the Indus Valley civilization.
 Dvārakā – Ancient city of Krishna, hero of the Mahabharata. Now largely excavated. Off the coast of the Indian state of Gujarat.
 Kalibangan – Located in Rajasthan, India – early city of the Indus Valley Civilization.
 Lothal – Located in Gujarat, India – early city of the Indus Valley Civilization.
 Pattadakal – Located in Karnataka, South India. Now a UNESCO World Heritage site.
 Puhar, Mayiladuthurai – Located in Tamil Nadu, South India.
 Rakhigarhi – Located in Haryana, largest Indus Valley Civilization site, dating back to 4600 BCE.
 Surkotada – Located in Gujarat, India – early city of the Indus Valley Civilization.
 Vasai – Located in India, former capital (1533–1740) of the Northern Provinces of Portuguese India
 Vijayanagara – Located in Karnataka, India. Now a UNESCO World Heritage site.

Uncertain or Disputed
 Kumari Kandam — A fictional lost continent south of India.

Undiscovered 
 Muziris – Located near Cranganore, Kerala, southern India

Nepal 
 Lumbini – Located in Rupandehi district, birthplace of Gautam Buddha. Now a UNESCO World Heritage site.
 Sinja Valley – Located in Jumla district, capital city of medieval Khasa Kingdom and origin of Khas (Nepali) language. Now a UNESCO World Heritage site.

Pakistan

Rediscovered 
 Chanhudaro – Located in Pakistan's Sindh province, an Indus Valley civilization city
Ganweriwal  – Located in the Cholistan Desert of Punjab, Pakistan – was a large town of the Indus Valley Civilization, not yet excavated.
Harappa – Located in Punjab, Pakistan – early city of the Indus Valley Civilization
 Kot Diji – Located in Pakistan's Sindh province Indus Valley civilization city
 Mehrgarh – Located in Pakistan's Balochistan province Indus Valley civilization city
 Mohenjo-daro – Located in Sindh, Pakistan — early city of the Indus Valley civilization. The city was one of the early urban settlements in the world.
Seri Bahlol – Located in Khyber Pakhtunkhwa province — an ancient town, now the site of ruins.
Sokhta Koh – Located near the city of Pasni — another ancient settlement of the Indus Valley.
Sutkagan Dor – Located near the Dasht River — was a small settlement in the Indus Valley, now in ruins.
Takht-i-Bahi – Located in Khyber Pakhtunkhwa province — an ancient Indo-Parthian Buddhist monastery site.
 Taxila – Located in Pakistan's Punjab province.

Undiscovered 
 Naga Puram – Located in Pakistan's Sindh province, a city of the Indus Valley civilization. The city was on the banks of the Ghaghara River.

Sri Lanka

Rediscovered 
 Anuradhapura – Now a UNESCO World Heritage site.
 Sigiriya – Now a UNESCO World Heritage site.
 Polonnaruwa – Now a UNESCO World Heritage site.

Southeast Asia

Rediscovered 

 Angkor and surroundings. – Now a UNESCO World Heritage site.
 Ayutthaya – Now a UNESCO World Heritage site.
 Mahendraparvata
 Sukhothai – Now a UNESCO World Heritage site.
 Wilwatikta – Capital city of Majapahit Kingdom, now in Trowulan, Mojokerto, East Java, Indonesia.

Undiscovered 
 Gangga Negara – Malaysia (Malay Archipelago)

Uncertain or Disputed 
 Kota Gelanggi – Malaysia (Malay Archipelago)
 Ma-i – Philippines – was a sovereign polity that pre-dated the Hispanic establishment of the Philippines and notable for having established trade relations with the Kingdom of Brunei, and with Song and Ming Dynasty China. Its existence was recorded both in the Chinese Imperial annals Zhu Fan Zhi (諸番志) and History of Song.

Western Asia

Rediscovered 
 Ani – Medieval Armenian capital, located on the Turkish side of the Armenia–Turkey border.
 Antioch – Ancient Greek city, important stronghold in the time of the Crusades.
 Babylon
 Caesarea
 Çatalhöyük – A Neolithic and Chalcolithic settlement, located near the modern city of Konya, Turkey.
 Choqa Zanbil
 Ctesiphon
 Göbekli Tepe
 Kourion, Cyprus
 Hattusa – Capital of the Hittite Empire. Located near the modern village of Boğazköy in north-central Turkey.
 Kish
 Lagash
 Mada'in Saleh (and capitol Petra) – Now a UNESCO World Heritage site.
 New Sarai – Capital of the Golden Horde
 Nineveh
 Persepolis
 Samaria
 Tmutarakan
 Troy
 Ur

Undiscovered 
 Akkad
 Arimathea
 Balanjar – Second Khazar capital
 Dilmun
 Ekallatum
 Iram of the Pillars
 Khazaran
 Kussara
 Samandar
 Turquoise Mountain (Firozkoh) – Summer capital of the Ghurid dynasty of Afghanistan, destroyed 1223
 Washukanni – Capital of the Hurrian kingdom of Mitanni

Uncertain or Disputed 

 Atil — Final capital of the Khazar Khagnate, located in the vicinity of Samosdelka, Russia.
 Irisaĝrig – Southern Iraq, near the town of Afak
 Narbata – Hebrew: נרבתא. Jewish city in The Great Revolt.
 Old Sarai – Capital of the Golden Horde
 Saqsin

Europe

Austria 
 Noreia – the capital of the ancient Celtic kingdom of Noricum. Possibly in southern Austria or Slovenia.

Bosnia and Herzegovina 
 Daorson – the capital of ancient Hellenic community in present-day Bosnia and Herzegovina.

Bulgaria 
 Perperikon in Bulgaria – The megalith complex had been laid in ruins and re-erected many times in history – from the Bronze Age until Middle Ages.
 Seuthopolis, Bulgaria – an ancient Thracian city, discovered and excavated in 1948. It was founded by king Seuthes III around 325 BC. Its ruins are now located at the bottom of the Koprinka Reservoir near the city of Kazanlak.

Croatia 
 Heraclea somewhere in the Adriatic on the Croatian coast. Exact location unknown.

Denmark 
 Høgekøbing, Denmark
 Serridslev, Denmark

Finland 
 Teljä, Finland

France 
 Quentovic – In 842, the ancient port of Quentovicus was destroyed by a Viking fleet.
 Thérouanne – In 1553, the city was razed, the roads broken up and the fields ploughed and salted by command of Charles V.

Germany 
 Damasia – An ancient hill-top settlement on the Lech, of the Licates, a tribe of the Celtic Vindelici. Commonly identified with either the Auerberg or pre-Roman Augsburg. According to folklore, sunken into the Ammersee.
 Hedeby, Germany
 Rungholt – Wadden Sea in Germany, sunk during the "Grote Mandrenke", a storm surge in the North Sea on January 16, 1362
 Niedam near Rungholt
 Vineta

Greece 
 Akrotiri – On the island of Thera, Greece.
 Chryse Island in the Aegean, reputed site of an ancient temple still visible on the sea floor.
 Helike, Greece on the Peloponnese – Sunk by an earthquake in the 4th century BC and rediscovered in the 1990s.
 Mycenae, Greece
 Pavlopetri, Greece underwater off the coast of southern Laconia in Peloponnese, is about 5,000 years old, and is the oldest submerged archeological town site.

Hungary 
 Avar Ring, Hungary – Central stronghold of the Avars, it is believed to have been in the wide plain between the Danube and the Tisza.

Italy 
 Acerrae Vatriae – a town of the Sarranates mentioned by Pliny the elder as having been situated in an unknown location in Umbria.
 Castro - a city in Lazio, capital of a Duchy ruled by the Farnese family. It was destroyed by the Papal army in 1649 
 Luni, Italy
 Paestum – Greek and Roman city south of Naples. Three famous Greek temples.
 Pompeii, Herculaneum and Stabiae in Italy – buried by the eruption of Vesuvius in 79 AD and rediscovered in the 18th century
 Sybaris, Italy – Ancient Greek colonial city of unsurpassed wealth utterly destroyed by its arch-rival Crotona in 510 BC.
 Tripergole, Italy – Ancient Roman spa village on the eastern shores of the Lucrine Lake in the Campi Flegrei. The village and most of the lake were buried by tephra in 1538 during the volcanic eruption that created Monte Nuovo. The exact location of the village and its associated hot springs can no longer be identified.

Lithuania 
 Apuolė

Netherlands 
 Brittenburg, ancient Roman settlement, Netherlands
 Dorestad, Netherlands
 Reimerswaal, Netherlands – flooded in the 16th century.
 Saeftinghe, Netherlands – prosperous city lost to the sea in 1584.

Norway 
 Kaupang – In Viksfjord near Larvik, Norway. Largest trading city around the Oslo Fjord during the Viking age. As sea levels retreated (the shoreline is 7m lower today than in 1000) the city was no longer accessible from the ocean and was abandoned.

Poland 
 Biskupin
 Truso

Portugal 
 Conímbriga, Portugal – early trading post dating to the 9th century BC. Abandoned in the 8th century AD.

Romania 
 Sarmisegetuza Regia, the old capital of the Ancient Dacian Kingdom.
 Vicina, a port on the Danube, near the Delta.

Russia 
 Bolghar – important Silk Road city on the Volga river, razed by the Tatar. 
 Ilimsk was a small town in Siberia. Flooded by the Ust-Ilimsk Reservoir in the mid-1970s.
 Kitezh – Mythical city beneath the waters in central Russia.
 Mangazeya, a trading colony on the Pomors' Northern Sea Route, was abandoned in the 17th century after the Northern Sea Route was banned. Mangazeya was considered lost until it was re-discovered by archaeologists in 1967.
 Peremyshl – town that was founded in 1152.
 Tmutarakan was a trading town of Rus' Khaganate

Serbia 
 Stari Ras, Serbia – one of the first capitals of the medieval Serbian state of Raška, abandoned in the 13th century.

Slovakia 
 Myšia Hôrka (near Spišský Štvrtok), Slovakia – 3500 years old town (rediscovered in the 20th century) and archaeological site; complex is called also Slovak Mycenae.

Spain 
 Amaya – either the capital or one of the most important cities of the Cantabri. Probably located in what nowadays is called "Amaya Peak" in Burgos, northern Spain.
 Cypsela, drowned Ibero-Greek settlement in the Catalan shore, Spain. Mentioned by Greek, Roman and Medieval chroniclers.
 Reccopolis, Spain – One of the capital cities founded in Hispania by the Visigoths. The site was incrementally abandoned in the 10th century.
 Tartessos, Spain – A harbor city or an economical complex of small harbors and trade routes set on the mouth of the Guadalquivir river, in modern Andalusia, Spain. Tartessos is believed to be either the seat of an independent kingdom or a community of palatial cities devoted to exporting the mineral resources of the Hispanic mainland to the sea, to meet the Phoenician and Greek traders. Its destruction is still a matter of debate among historians, and one modern tendency tends to believe that Tartessos was never a city, but a culture complex.

Sweden 
 Birka, Sweden
 Ny Varberg, Sweden
 Uppåkra, Sweden

United Kingdom 
Just the walls remain and a street pattern can be discerned from the air.
 Dunwich, England – Lost to coastal erosion. Once a large town, now reduced to a small village
 Evonium, Scotland – purported coronation site and capital of 40 kings
 Fairbourne, Wales - managed retreat policy adopted by council in 2019 due to flooding prospects following climate change
 Hallsands, Devon - Built on a beach, last resident left in 1960, closed to public. Several derelict buildings still stand.
 Hampton-on-Sea, England – A village in what is now the Hampton area of Herne Bay, Kent, drowned and abandoned between 1916 and 1921.
 Kenfig, – a village  in Bridgend, Wales, encroached by sand and abandoned around the 13th century.
 Nant Gwrtheyrn former village on the North Welsh coast, abandoned after its quarry closed during World War II. Now regenerated as a language centre.
 Old Sarum, England – population moved to nearby Salisbury in the 13th and 14th centuries, although the owners of the archaeological site retained the right to elect a Member of Parliament to represent Old Sarum until the 19th century (see William Pitt).
 Ravenser Odd, England - important port near the mouth of the Humber, lost to coastal erosion in the 14th century.
 Ravenspurn, England - near to Ravenser Odd, lost to coastal erosion at some time after 1471.
 Roxburgh, Scotland – abandoned in the 15th century
 Selsey, England – mostly abandoned to coastal erosion after 1043.
 Skara Brae, Orkney, Scotland – Neolithic settlement buried under sediment. Uncovered by a winter storm in 1850.
 Trellech, Wales - declined between the 13th and 15th centuries.
 Winchelsea, East Sussex – Old Winchelsea, Important Channel port, pop 4000+, abandoned after 1287 inundation and coastal erosion.

Ukraine 
 Árheimar, a capital of the Goths, that was located near the Dnieper river
 Bolokhiv, Ukraine abandoned in the 13th century.

North America

Canada

Rediscovered 
 L'Anse aux Meadows – Viking settlement founded around 1000. Now a UNESCO World Heritage site.
 Lost Villages – The Lost Villages are ten communities (Aultsville, Dickinson's Landing, Farran's Point, Maple Grove, Mille Roches, Moulinette, Santa Cruz, Sheek's Island, Wales, Woodlands) in the Canadian province of Ontario, in the former townships of Cornwall and Osnabruck (now South Stormont) near Cornwall, which were permanently submerged by the creation of the St. Lawrence Seaway in 1958.

Caribbean

Rediscovered 
 Port Royal, Jamaica – Destroyed by the 1692 Jamaica earthquake.

Mexico and Central America

Maya cities 
Incomplete list – for further information, see Maya civilization

Rediscovered 
 Calakmul – One of two superpowers in the classic Maya period. Now a UNESCO World Heritage site.
 Chichen Itza – This ancient place of pilgrimage is still the most visited Maya ruin. Now a UNESCO World Heritage site.
 Coba
 Copán – In modern Honduras. Now a UNESCO World Heritage site.
 Naachtun – Rediscovered in 1922, it remains one of the most remote and least visited Maya sites. Its ancient name was identified in the mid-1990s as Masuul.
 Palenque — in the Mexican state of Chiapas, known for its beautiful art and architecture. Now a UNESCO World Heritage site.
 Tikal — One of two superpowers in the classic Maya period. Now a UNESCO World Heritage site.
 Tulum – Mayan coastal city.

Olmec cities

Rediscovered 
 La Venta – In the present day Mexican state of Tabasco.
 San Lorenzo Tenochtitlán – In the present day Mexican state of Veracruz.

Totonac Cities

Rediscovered 
 Teotihuacan – Pre-Aztec Mexico. Now a UNESCO World Heritage site.

Other

Rediscovered 
 Izapa – Chief city of the Izapa civilization, whose territory extended from the Gulf Coast across to the Pacific Coast of Chiapas, in present-day Mexico, and Guatemala.
 Guayabo – In Costa Rica. It is believed that the site was inhabited from 1500 BCE to 1400 CE, and had at its peak a population of around 10,000.

United States

Rediscovered 
 The cities of the Ancestral Pueblo (or Anasazi) culture, located in the Four Corners region of the Southwest United States – The best known are located at Chaco Canyon and Mesa Verde.
 Etzanoa – located in Arkansas City, Kansas. City of the Wichita culture. It was home to around 20,000 people at its height, and it was inhabited from c. 1450-1700 AD.
 Bethel Indian Town, New Jersey – Lenape settlement which disappeared as the Lenape were pushed west.
 Cahokia – Located near present-day St. Louis, Missouri. At its height Cahokia is believed to have had a population of between 40,000 and 80,000 people, making it amongst the largest Pre-Columbian cities of the Americas. It is known chiefly for its huge pyramidal mounds of compacted earth. Now a UNESCO World Heritage site.
 Pueblo Grande de Nevada a complex of villages, located near Overton, Nevada
 Roanoke Colony
 Sarabay – a Mocama settlement in northeast Florida, mentioned in both French and Spanish documents dating to the 1560s.

South America

Inca cities

Rediscovered 
 Choquequirao – One of the last bastions of Incan resistance against the Spaniards and refuge of Manco Inca Yupanqui.
 Machu Picchu – Possibly Pachacuti's Family Palace. Now a UNESCO World Heritage site.
 Vilcabamba – Currently known as Espiritu Pampa, the capital of the Neo-Inca State (1539–1572).
 Vitcos – Currently known as Rosaspata, a residence and ceremonial center of the Neo-Inca State.

Other

Rediscovered 
 Cahuachi – Nazca, in present-day Peru.
 Caral – An important center of the Norte Chico civilization, in present-day Peru. Now a UNESCO World Heritage site.
 Chan Chan – Chimu. Located near Trujillo, in present-day Peru. Now a UNESCO World Heritage site.
 Kuelap – A massive ruined city, still covered in jungle, that was the capital of the Chachapoyas culture in Northern Peru.
 Nueva Cádiz, in Venezuela. It was one of the first Spanish settlements in the Americas.
 Santa María la Antigua del Darién – First permanent European settlement in the mainland of the continental Americas, in the Darién region between Panama and Colombia. Founded by Vasco Núñez de Balboa in 1510. Found in 2012.
 Teyuna (Ciudad Perdida) located in present-day Colombia
 Tiahuanaco – pre-Inca. Located in present-day Bolivia. Now a UNESCO World Heritage site.

Status Unknown 
 La Ciudad Blanca

Undiscovered and fictional lost cities

Legendary 
 Ai – important city in the Hebrew Bible
 Arthurian Camelot
 Atlantis
 Aztlán- the ancestral homeland in Aztec mythology
 Ciudad de los Cesares (City of the Caesars, also variously known as City of the Patagonia, Elelín, Lin Lin, Trapalanda, Trapananda, or Wandering City) – a legendary city in Patagonia, never found
 Dvārakā – An ancient city of Krishna, submerged in the sea.
 El Dorado
 Iram of the Pillars – this may refer to a lost Arabian city in the Empty Quarter, but sources also identify it as a tribe or an area mentioned in the Quran
 Kitezh, Russia – legendary underwater city which supposedly may be seen in good weather
 Libertatia, Madagascar – (Also known as Libertalia) was a pirate colony founded in the 17th century by pirate Captain James Misson (occasionally spelled "Mission") that is still disputed by historians today.
 Lost City of Z – a city allegedly located in the jungles of the Mato Grosso region of Brazil, said to have been seen by the British explorer Col. Percy Harrison Fawcett some time before World War I
 Lyonesse
 Otuken – legendary capital city of Gokturks in Turkic mythology
 Paititi – a legendary city and refuge in the rainforests where Bolivia, Brazil, and Peru meet
 The Seven Cities of Gold
 Shambhala – Mythical kingdom said to be located in Tibet 
 Sodom and Gomorrah
 Vineta – legendary city somewhere at the Baltic coast of Germany or Poland
 Ys – legendary city on the western coast of France

That some cities are considered legendary does not mean they did not in fact exist. Some that were once considered legendary are now known to have existed, such as Troy and Bjarmaland.

Fictional 

 Brigadoon – from the musical of the same name
 Charn – from The Chronicles of Narnia
 Lemuria – a supposed Indian-Pacific land
 Leng - Antarctic city described in H.P. Lovecraft's At the Mountains of Madness
 Númenor – from The Lord of the Rings
 Opar – from the Tarzan novels
 R'lyeh – sunken city referenced in many of the works of H. P. Lovecraft, where the godlike being Cthulhu is buried
 Sarnath – city described in H.P. Lovecraft's short story "The Doom that Came to Sarnath"
 Shangri-La - fictional place from James Hilton's 1933 novel Lost Horizon
 Skull Island – from the King Kong movies
 The Nameless City - ancient city in the Arabian desert described in H.P. Lovecraft's short story The Nameless City 
 Valyria - from George R. R. Martin's A Song of Ice and Fire universe

See also 

 Ephemerality 
 Ghost town
 List of mythological places
 List of lost lands
 Ruins
 Societal collapse

References 

City
Lists of cities